The six teams in this group played against each other on a home-and-away basis. The group winner Poland qualified for the 17th FIFA World Cup held in South Korea and Japan. The runner-up Ukraine advanced to the UEFA Play-off and played against Germany.  Poland led the group from the start, with six wins and two draws out of eight, with Ukraine in second place: however, with group victory already sewn up, they unexpectedly went down 4-1 to Belarus, which gave the Belarusians a chance of overtaking Ukraine if they won their final match against Wales and Ukraine failed to win in Poland. However, Belarus failed to reproduce the form of their previous match, and lost 1-0 to hand Wales their only victory of the campaign, Ukraine thus finishing second regardless of their result in Poland (a 1-1 draw).

Standings

Results

Goalscorers

9 goals

 Andriy Shevchenko

8 goals

 Emmanuel Olisadebe

5 goals

 Raman Vasilyuk
 John Carew
 Radosław Kałużny

4 goals

 John Hartson

3 goals

 Arthur Petrosyan
 Alexander Khatskevich
 Marcin Żewłakow

2 goals

 Valentin Belkevich
 Mikalay Ryndzyuk
 Bård Borgersen
 Ole Gunnar Solskjær
 Bartosz Karwan
 Paweł Kryszałowicz
 Andriy Vorobei
 Nathan Blake

1 goal

 Hayk Hakobyan
 Felix Khojoyan
 Artak Minasyan
 Andrey Movsisyan
 Thorstein Helstad
 Frode Johnsen
 Ronny Johnsen
 Michał Żewłakow
 Andriy Husin
 Hennadiy Zubov
 Craig Bellamy
 Mark Pembridge
 Robbie Savage
 Gary Speed

External links
FIFA official page
RSSSF - 2002 World Cup Qualification
Allworldcup

5
2000 in Armenian football
2001 in Armenian football
2000 in Belarusian football
2001 in Belarusian football
2000 in Norwegian football
2001 in Norwegian football
2000–01 in Polish football
qual
2000–01 in Ukrainian football
2001–02 in Ukrainian football
2000–01 in Welsh football
2001–02 in Welsh football